The Platinum Collection is an album by American singer-songwriter Guy Clark, released in 2008. Although the liner notes state that this album contains all twenty tracks from the 1978 album Guy Clark & the 1981 album The South Coast of Texas there are, in fact, 8 tracks from each album plus four from the 1992 album Boats to Build

Track listing
All songs by Guy Clark unless otherwise noted.
 "The Houston Kid" – 4:02  
 "Fool on the Roof" – 4:12  
 "Fools for Each Other" – 4:17  
 "Voila, An American Dream" – 3:49  
 "One Paper Kid" (Walter Cowart) – 3:25  
 "In the Jailhouse Now" (Jimmie Rodgers) – 3:49  
 "Comfort and Crazy" – 3:09  
 "Don't You Take It Too Bad" (Townes Van Zandt) – 4:04  
 "Must Be My Baby" – 2:55  
 "New Cut Road" – 3:46  
 "Rita Ballou" – 3:14  
 "Heartbroke" – 3:02  
 "Who Do You Think You Are" – 3:28  
 "The South Coast of Texas" – 3:47  
 "She's Crazy for Leavin'" (Clark, Crowell) – 2:55  
 "Lone Star Hotel" – 3:26  
 "Baton Rouge" (Clark, Crowley) – 2:48  
 "The Partner Nobody Chose" (Clark, Crowley) – 3:11  
 "Ramblin' Jack and Mahan" (Clark, Leigh) – 3:50  
 "Too Much" (Clark, Parnell) – 2:56

Personnel
Guy Clark – vocals, guitar

Guy Clark compilation albums
2008 compilation albums
Warner Records compilation albums